ACSI may also refer to:

 Acta Chimica Slovenica, a peer-reviewed chemical journal published by the Slovenian Chemical Society
 American Customer Satisfaction Index, an economic indicator that measures the satisfaction of consumers in the U.S.
 Anglo-Chinese School (Independent)
 Associate of the Chartered Institute for Securities & Investment (ACSI)
 Association of Christian Schools International
 Audax Club Sportivo Italiano
 Advanced Cyclotron Systems Inc, a supplier of medical cyclotrons
 Abstract communication service interface, a part of IEC 61850 Standard
 Australian Council of Superannuation Investors